Monodonta australis, common name the toothed topshell, is a species of sea snail, a marine gastropod mollusk in the family Trochidae, the top snails.

Description
The size of the shell varies between 12 mm and 35 mm. The shell is similar to Monodonta labio, but with rounder whorls, more marked sutures and with lower lirae. It is not granulose. It is tessellated with black and grayish or greenish. The penultimate whorl is subangulate by the prominence of its central rib. The columella is much less strongly dentate than in Monodonta labio, and the notch or canal below it shallow. The basal plicae are less developed than in Monodontia labio.

Distribution
This marine species occurs off South Africa and in the Indian Ocean off Madagascar, Aldabra and the Mascarene Basin; also off Japan.

References

 Williams S.T., Donald K.M., Spencer H.G. & Nakano T. (2010) Molecular systematics of the marine gastropod families Trochidae and Calliostomatidae (Mollusca: Superfamily Trochoidea). Molecular Phylogenetics and Evolution 54:783–809.

External links
 

australis
Gastropods described in 1816